Judge Gilmore may refer to:

Horace Weldon Gilmore (1918–2010), judge of the United States District Court for the Eastern District of Michigan
William J. Gilmore (1821–1896), justice of the Supreme Court of Ohio
Vanessa Gilmore (born 1956), judge of the United States District Court for the Southern District of Texas

See also
Helen W. Gillmor (born 1942), judge of the United States District Court for the District of Hawaii